Plagiaulacida is a group of extinct multituberculate mammals. Multituberculates were among the most common mammals of the Mesozoic, "the age of the dinosaurs". Plagiaulacids are a paraphyletic grouping, containing all multituberculates that lie outside of the advanced group Cimolodonta. They ranged from the Middle Jurassic Period to the early Late Cretaceous of the northern hemisphere. During the Cenomanian, they were replaced by the more advanced cimolodontans.

Kielan-Jaworowska and Hurum (2001) divides “Plagiaulacida” into three informal lineages, the paulchoffatiids, the plagiaulicids, and the allodontids.

Allodontid line 

The Allodontid line may be a superfamily, Allodontoidea.

Both allodontids and paulchoffatiids (below) were among the most basal of the plagiaulacids.  The Allodontid line contains:

The family Allodontidae is known from two genera from the Upper Jurassic Morrison Formation of North America.

The family Zofiabaataridae contains a single genus, Zofiabaatar and is also from the Morrison Formation. The affinities of a further Morrison Formation genus, Glirodon, are unclear, but it's also within the Allodontid line.

Paulchoffatiid line 

The Paulchoffatiid line may be a superfamily, Paulchoffatioidea.

Some remains from the Middle Jurassic of England might belong within this group.  Representatives are best known from the Upper Jurassic, (especially from Guimarota, Portugal), though some were still extant during the Lower Cretaceous.

The genera of the family Paulchoffatiidae are divided into two of subfamilies, plus a couple of harder-to-place individuals:
Subfamily Paulchoffatiinae includes Paulchoffatia and its relatives. This taxon contains nine genera.
Subfamily Kuehneodontinae consists solely of the genus Kuehneodon, though there are half-a-dozen named species.

Other genera include Galveodon and  Sunnyodon, both based on teeth from the Lower Cretaceous of Spain and England respectively.

Also referable to the paulchoffatiid line, but not the family itself, is the family Pinheirodontidae, which is known from Early Cretaceous teeth found in Iberia and England. As well as Rugosodon from the Middle-Late Jurassic of China.

Plagiaulacid line (possibly Superfamily Plagiaulacoidea) 

Family Plagiaulacidae is known from the Upper Jurassic (North America) to Lower Cretaceous (Europe), being represented by Plagiaulax, Bolodon, and Morrisonodon.

Family Albionbaataridae is known from the Upper Jurassic to Lower Cretaceous of Europe and Asia, (China – undescribed, 2001). These were shrew-sized Multituberculates, with some similarities to the paulchoffis.

Members of the family Eobaataridae display dental similarities with members of Paracimexomys group, (Cimolodonta). They are known from the Upper Jurassic to Lower Cretaceous of Europe and Asia.

Sinobaatar was described after the study by Kielan-Jaworowska and Hurum (2001). The Mongolian word ‘baatar’ is frequently employed in the nomenclature of Multituberculates. This reflects the fact that many of the most complete fossils have been recovered from sites in Mongolia, though this more applies to members of the more derived Cimolodonta.

A couple of further genera possibly fit somewhere within “Plagiaulacida”. This has been tentatively proposed for Janumys of the Middle Cretaceous. Its contemporary, Ameribaatar, is of uncertain affinities. Both were first described late in 2001.

Taxonomy
Subclass  †Allotheria 
 Order †Multituberculata :
 suborder †Plagiaulacida 
 Family †Paulchoffatiidae 
 subfamily †Paulchoffatiinae 
 Genus †Paulchoffatia 
 Species †P. delgador 
 Genus †Pseudobolodon 
 Species †P. oreas 
 Species †P. krebsi 
 Genus †Henkelodon 
 Species †H. naias 
 Genus †Guimarotodon 
 Species †G. leiriensis 
 Genus †Meketibolodon 
 Species †M. robustus 
 Genus †Plesiochoffatia 
 Species †P. thoas 
 Species †P. peparethos 
 Species †P. staphylos 
 Genus †Xenachoffatia 
 Species †X. oinopion 
 Genus †Bathmochoffatia 
 Species †B. hapax 
 Genus †Kielanodon 
 Species †K. hopsoni 
 Genus †Meketichoffatia 
 Species †M. krausei 
 Genus †Galveodon 
 Species †G. nannothus 
 Genus †Sunnyodon 
 Species †S. notleyi 
 Subfamily †Kuehneodontinae 
 Genus †Kuehneodon 
 Species †K. dietrichi 
 Species †K. barcasensis 
 Species †K. dryas 
 Species †K. guimarotensis 
 Species †K. hahni 
 Species †K. simpsoni 
 Species †K. uniradiculatus 
 Family †Pinheirodontidae 
 Genus †Pinheirodon 
 Species †P. pygmaeus 
 Species †P. vastus 
 Genus †Bernardodon 
 Species †B. atlantica 
 Genus †Gerhardodon 
 Species †G. purbeckensis 
 Genus †Iberodon 
 Species †I. quadrituberculatus 
 Genus †Lavocatia 
 Species †L. alfambrensis 
 Genus †Ecprepaulax 
 Species †E. anomala 
 Family †Allodontidae 
 Genus †Ctenacodon 
 Species †C. serratus 
 Species †C. nanus 
 Species †C. laticeps 
 Species †C. scindens 
 Genus †Psalodon 
 Species †P. potens 
 Species †P. fortis 
 Species †P. marshi 
 Family †Zofiabaataridae 
 Genus †Zofiabaatar 
 Species †Z. pulcher 
 Family Incertae sedis
 Genus †Glirodon 
 Species †G. grandis 
 Family †Plagiaulacidae 
 Genus †Morrisonodon 
 Species †M. brentbaatar 
 Genus †Plagiaulax 
 Species †P. becklesii 
 Genus †Bolodon 
 Species †B. crassidens 
 Species †B. falconeri 
 Species †B. minor 
 Species †B. osborni 
 Species †B. elongatus 
 Family †Eobaataridae 
 Genus †Eobaatar 
 Species †E. magnus 
 Species †E. minor 
 Species †E. hispanicus 
 Species †E. pajaronensis 
 Genus †Loxaulax 
 Species †L. valdensis 
 Genus †Monobaatar 
 Species †M. mimicus 
 Genus †Parendotherium 
 Species †Parendotherium herreroi 
 Genus †Sinobaatar 
 Species †Sinobaatar lingyuanensis 
 Genus †Heishanobaatar 
 Species †H. triangulus 
 Genus †Teutonodon 
 Species †Teutonodon langenbergensis 
 Family †Albionbaataridae 
 Genus †Albionbaatar 
 Species †A. denisae 
 Genus †Proalbionbaatar 
 Species †P. plagiocyrtus 
 Genus †Kielanobaatar 
 Species †K. badaohaoensis 
 Family †Arginbaataridae 
 Genus †Arginbaatar 
 Species †Arginbaatar dmitrievae

References 

 Hahn G & Hahn R (2000), Multituberculates from the Guimarota mine, p. 97-107 in
 Martin T & Krebs B (eds), Guimarota - A Jurassic Ecosystem, Published by Dr Friedrich Pfeil, Münich, Germany.
 Kielan-Jaworowska Z & Hurum JH (2001), Phylogeny and Systematics of multituberculate mammals.  Paleontology 44, p. 389-429.
 Much of this information has been derived from  Multituberculata Cope, 1884.

Multituberculates
Jurassic mammals
Cretaceous mammals
Paraphyletic groups